The Concord Golf Club is a golf club in Concord, New South Wales, Australia, a suburb of Sydney. It hosted the Women's Australian Open in 2004 with the champion being Laura Davies from England. The clubhouse was designed by Thomas Pollard Sampson, a member, in 1921. Whilst substantially added to in the 2000s the original building remains intact internally.

External links

Concord Golf Club course review, Golf Australia

1899 establishments in Australia
Sports clubs established in 1899
Sports venues completed in 1899
Golf clubs and courses in New South Wales
Sporting clubs in Sydney
Sports venues in Sydney